The United Front of Mozambique is a political party in Mozambique. 
At the last legislative elections, 1 and 2 December 2004, the party was the main part of the Renamo-UE electoral alliance, that won 29.7% of the popular vote and 90 out of 250 seats. The presidential candidate of this alliance, Afonso Dhlakama, won 31.7% of the popular vote.

References

Political parties in Mozambique